Bozveli may refer to:

 Bozveli Peak, peak in the Antarctic Peninsula
 Neofit Bozveli (1785-1848), Bulgarian cleric